Charles Roberts (born April 3, 1979) is a former Canadian football running back who played for the Winnipeg Blue Bombers and BC Lions of the Canadian Football League.

College
Roberts attended Sacramento State, where he set numerous DI-AA rushing records for the Sac State Hornets football team, including total rushing yards and most yards in a game (409 yards vs Idaho State in 1999). His nickname while with the Hornets was "Choo-Choo Charlie", in reference to the train that would often come by behind the stadium during games and practices. Upon graduation, he went to Winnipeg, Manitoba, Canada to play for the Canadian Football League team, the Winnipeg Blue Bombers.

Blue Bombers
In his 8-year tenure he established himself as one of the premier running backs in the Canadian Football League, earning the nickname "Blink" for his amazing quickness and agility. He led the league in rushing yards in 2006 with 1609 yards and 10 touchdowns, earning a nomination as the East's Most Outstanding Player.
Off the field he experienced highs and lows. The enigmatic back missed team flights, led the league in all-purpose yards, pondered retirement, led the league in rushing yards, publicly criticized some decisions, and signed a long-term big money deal to remain as the face of the Bombers.

Through the 2006 season, Roberts rushed for 8,091 yards in just six seasons with the Blue Bombers.  He also tallied up 2,732 receiving yards and 57 touchdowns.

On September 2, 2007 Roberts passed Leo Lewis to become the Winnipeg Blue Bombers all-time leading rusher.  He is also fifth all-time in CFL career rushing totals.

Roberts was selected in 2005 as one of the 20 All-Time Blue Bomber Greats.

On September 1, 2008, Roberts was traded to the BC Lions for fellow RB Joe Smith.

BC Lions
On September 13, 2008, in a game against the Roughriders, Roberts ran to surpass 10,000 rushing yards in his CFL career.

On December 3, 2008, the Lions announced that Roberts' 2009 option was not being renewed and as a result he became a free agent. He retired from the game shortly thereafter.

Post-football
Since retiring as a player, Roberts moved to and now resides in Long Beach, California, where he works for the United States Postal Service.

On September 18, 2013, Roberts was inducted into the Blue Bombers' Hall of Fame.

In 2014, he was inducted into the Canadian Football Hall of Fame.

Statistics

References

External links
 Player Profile on the Winnipeg Blue Bombers' "All-Time Greats" list

1979 births
Living people
African-American players of Canadian football
BC Lions players
Canadian Football Hall of Fame inductees
Canadian Football League Rookie of the Year Award winners
Canadian football running backs
People from Montclair, California
Sacramento State Hornets football players
Sportspeople from San Bernardino County, California
Winnipeg Blue Bombers players
21st-century African-American sportspeople
20th-century African-American sportspeople